Clydonochilus is a genus of sea snails, marine gastropod mollusks in the subfamily Fossarininae  of the  family Trochidae, the top snails.

Species
 Clydonochilus mariei Fischer, P., 1890

References

 Crosse, H., 1890. Description d'un nouveau genre de Gastropodes marins. Journal de Conchyliologie 38: 114-118
 Fischer-Piette, E., 1950. Liste des types décrits dans le Journal de Conchyliologie et conservés dans la collection de ce journal (avec planches)(suite). Journal de Conchyliologie 90: 149-180
 Dekker, H. & Orlin, Z., 2000 [November].Checklist of Red Sea Mollusca . Spirula, 47 Supplement:1-46

External links
 To World Register of Marine Species
 Fischer P. (1890). Description d'un nouveau genre de Gastropodes marins. Journal de Conchyliologie. 38(2): 115-118

Trochidae
Monotypic gastropod genera